Ghazarahogh is a village de facto in the Martakert Province of the breakaway Republic of Artsakh, de jure in the Kalbajar District of Azerbaijan, in the disputed region of Nagorno-Karabakh. The village has an ethnic Armenian-majority population, and also had an Armenian majority in 1989.

History 
During the Soviet period, the village was a part of the Mardakert District of the Nagorno-Karabakh Autonomous Oblast.

Historical heritage sites 
Historical heritage sites in and around the village include a medieval village, church, chapel and cemetery.

Economy and culture 
The population is mainly engaged in agriculture, animal husbandry, and mining. The village is part of the community of Poghosagomer.

Demographics 
The village had 75 inhabitants in 2005, and 74 inhabitants in 2015.

References

External links 
 

Populated places in Martakert Province
Populated places in Kalbajar District